Black Moor may refer to:

 Black Moor (musical group), a heavy metal band
 Black Moor (Rhön), a wetland habitat in Germany
 Black Telescope goldfish, known as black moor, a variant of telescope eye goldfish
 "Harap Alb", a 1877 Romanian-language fairy tale

See also 
 Blackmore
 Blackamoors (disambiguation)
 White Moor (disambiguation)